Sons of Song were an American gospel male voice trio. The trio comprised Calvin Newton, Don Butler, and Bob Robinson. Their greatest success came with the 1960 album Wasted Years, named after the title song Wasted Years. The follow up album was Unto Him.

Discography

Wasted Years 1961
Side One: Wasted Years; Highway to Heaven; Had It Not Been for You; I've Got Love; How Far Is Heaven; Psalms [sic] of Victory Side Two: Thank You for Taking Me Home; If I Had My Life to Live Over;... 
Unto Him 1962 
Side One: Unto Him; Pass Me Not Oh Gentle Savior; Spiritual Medley; Have You Seen ... All about You; This Man; I'll Never Be Forsaken; American Medley; Songs of the Cross.
Something Old, Something New 1962
Gospel Time 1962
The Sons of Song Sing 12 Lee Roy Abernathy Songs, White Church 12-1791 recorded 1962, released 1971
Side One: You Can't Put a Price on Your Soul; Hard Labor; My God Goes with Me; Beautiful Streets of Gold; He's Such a Comfort to Me; All About Jesus. Side Two Lord, I'm Ready Now to Go; I'm Building a Bridge; I'm Gonna Roll Along; The Big Boss; Connect Me with My Lord; Mom and Dad.

References

American gospel singers